Crisis is the UK national charity for people experiencing  homelessness. The charity offers year-round education, employment, housing and well-being services from centres in East London, Newcastle, Oxford, Edinburgh, South Yorkshire, South Wales, Croydon, Brent and Merseyside, called Crisis Skylight Centres.

As well as year-round services Crisis runs Crisis at Christmas, which since 1972 has been offering food, warmth, companionship and vital services to homeless people over the Christmas period. In 2016 almost 4,600 homeless people visited Crisis at Christmas, which was run by about 10,500 volunteers.

Since its inception Crisis has been a campaigning organisation, lobbying government for political change that prevents and mitigates homelessness based on research commissioned and undertaken by the organisation.

Matt Downie OBE has been the chief executive of Crisis since 2022.

History

According to Crisis, the charity was "founded in 1967 in response to the shocking Ken Loach film Cathy Come Home shown the previous year, and a publicity campaign led by reforming Conservatives William Shearman and Ian Macleod highlighting the plight of homeless people". The drama-documentary Cathy Come Home was first broadcast by the BBC the previous November.

Since the sixties Crisis has evolved to meet the changing needs of single homeless people, campaigning for change and delivering services to help people find a route out of their homelessness across the UK.

It was one of the seven charities nominated by Prince Harry and Meghan Markle to receive donations in lieu of wedding presents when the couple married on 19 May 2018.

Crisis Skylight Centres

There are 11 Skylight Centres covering East London (Aldgate), Brent, Croydon, Oxford, Merseyside, South Wales, South Yorkshire, Newcastle, Edinburgh, Birmingham and Coventry. Crisis Skylight Centres are accredited education, training and employment centres, offering practical and creative workshops in supportive and inspiring environments, together with formal learning opportunities that lead to qualifications and finding work.

Crisis Skylight London opened in 2002, with a Crisis Skylight Cafe social enterprise opening on the same site on Commercial Street in East London in 2004. In 2007, Crisis Skylight Newcastle opened, followed by Crisis Skylight Birmingham and Crisis Skylight Edinburgh in 2010, Crisis Skylight Oxford and Crisis Skylight Merseyside in 2011 and Crisis Skylight Croydon in 2017.

Crisis at Christmas 

Since 1972 Crisis at Christmas has been offering food, warmth, companionship and  services to people experiencing homelessness in London over the Christmas period. The project is run almost entirely by around 10,500 volunteers, making it the largest volunteer-led event in the UK. In 2016, about 4,600 homeless people come through the doors. Since 2020, Crisis at Christmas has operated in three hotels across London, accommodating 450 people who would otherwise be sleeping rough over the Christmas period.  The charity also runs four temporary day centres in London for up to 4,800 people in insecure living situations.  

Services offered at Christmas include internet access, entertainment, food and drink, healthcare, opticians, podiatry, dentistry, natural healing and hairdressing.

During the key winter period Crisis at Christmas has centres in London, Edinburgh, Newcastle, Coventry and Birmingham.

Campaigns

Crisis is the national charity for people experiencing homelessness. "We know that homelessness is not inevitable. We know that together we can end it."

No One Turned Away

In October 2011 Crisis launched a campaign to improve the assistance and support provided by Local Authorities to single homeless people.

References

External links
Crisis web site

Homelessness charities in the United Kingdom
Charities based in London
1967 establishments in the United Kingdom
Organizations established in 1967